Silver thiocyanate is the silver salt of thiocyanic acid with the formula AgSCN.

Structure
AgSCN is monoclinic with 8 molecules per unit cell. Each SCN− group has an almost linear molecular geometry, with bond angle 179.6(5)°. Weak Ag—Ag interactions of length 0.3249(2) nm to 0.3338(2) nm are present in the structure.

Production
Silver thiocyanate is produced by the reaction between silver nitrate and potassium thiocyanate.

References

Thiocyanates
Silver compounds